"Get Like Me" is a song written and performed by American rapper Nelly featuring Nicki Minaj and Pharrell Williams. Produced by the latter, "Get Like Me" was released by Republic Records as the second single from the former's seventh studio album M.O. on July 2, 2013. Upon its release, the song was positively received by most music critics who praised the chemistry between the performers and praised its sound.

Background
"Get Like Me" was written by Nelly, Nicki Minaj and Pharrell Williams while the production was handled by Williams. In June, 2013, Nelly made the announcement on Twitter, writing "New NELLY FT @NICKIMINAJ ‘GET LIKE ME’ produce by @Pharrell dropping the 18th". The song was recorded in 2012 originally as a collaboration between Nelly and Williams. Speaking of "Get Like Me", Nelly stated, "Actually, me and Pharrell did the record maybe about a year ago and we were coming back to the records that we did, closing out the album and putting everything together and I was just like, 'Yo I think Nicki might be dope on this'... we made it happen and I was right. She [Nicki] killed it!". Williams commented, “When we get together, we like to do a song that evokes as much energy as possible.”

Composition
"Get Like Me" is a drum-driven song with sparse and percussive beat. Lyrically, it is a self-pride song, further described as "an ode to Nelly's dope-ness". Nelly sings about how everyone tries to steal his shine, "See the whole rap game/ They sounding like me". Minaj echoes his sentiments singing: "Get their own speakers and some pros like me/ When I'm at the game, all the pros like me." Minaj sings the lines "You should follow my example, bitch I.E./ 'Cause I'm front row Isaac Miz-ra-hi," putting "extra emphasis" on her words, by breaking down her rhymes into simple syllables. She also sings about the things she has accomplished throughout her career mentioning her Beats By Dr. Dre endorsement deal. Rob Markman from MTV News noted that the song initially was similar with Nelly and Pharrell's collaborations on "Hot in Herre" (2002) "Flap Your Wings" (2005) and further compared it with songs produced by The Neptunes. Jenna Hally Rubenstein of the same publication noted that it sounds very similar to other songs produced by Williams.

Critical reception

Rob Markman from MTV News praised the chemistry between Nelly and Pharrell Williams and added that Minaj's addition to the song "perfected the recipe". In another review, he noted that "Get Like Me" was another notable performance for Minaj's "star-studded" discography adding that it enhanced the "chemistry and excitement" in the song. He further praised Nelly's singing adding that the song was a proof that he "hasn't lost his jones for hip-hop". Mike Powell of the magazine Rolling Stone graded "Get Like Me" with three stars out of five writing in his review, "Despite the billing on the marquee, the fizzy, minimal second single from Nelly... belongs to Nicki and Pharrell. You'd think a rapper known for her overheated quirk would flame out next to someone as systematically cooled-out as Pharrell, but she rises to the occasion – ironically, by sitting down and leaning back."

Music video
A music video was shot in Los Angeles, on June 26, 2013, directed by Colin Tilley. A behind-the-scenes video was released on July 11, 2013. After several teasers, the music video premiered on 106 & Park on July 31, 2013 and peaked at number 1 on August 26, 2013. Nelly described the video as "equally energetic" with the song. He further said "[Nicki] brings energy, charisma, and her star power, and I think that’s what the video is about. It’s just about that star power and energy and the hypeness of the joint."

The video is shot in black and white and includes various scenes with video dancers as well as the three artists rapping in minimalist rooms with huge white screens behind them. One scene features a drum beat played on a woman's bare behind. It also features Minaj twerking on a throne.

Eric Diep of XXL magazine wrote that the three artists "turn the heat up" further praising Minaj for showing her "voluptuous curves". A writer of The Huffington Post described the video as "sexy" with "gratuitous footage of beautiful women dancing". A writer of Rap-Up described the video as "slick and sexy".

Track listing
Digital download
"Get Like Me" (featuring Nicki Minaj and Pharrell) – 3:52

Chart performance

Weekly

Year-end

Radio and release history

References

External links
 - music video on Vevo

2013 songs
Nelly songs
Nicki Minaj songs
Songs written by Nicki Minaj
Songs written by Pharrell Williams
Music videos directed by Colin Tilley
Song recordings produced by Pharrell Williams
Pharrell Williams songs
2013 singles
Black-and-white music videos
Songs written by Nelly